The 1960 Queensland state election was held on 28 May 1960.

By-elections
 On 31 May 1958, Jack Duggan (Labor) was elected to succeed Les Wood (Labor), who had died on 29 March 1958, as the member for North Toowoomba.
 On 6 June 1959, Carlisle Wordsworth (Country) was elected to succeed Bob Watson (Country), who had died on 26 March 1959, as the member for Mulgrave. However, he himself died on 7 May 1960.

Retiring Members
Note: Mulgrave Country MLA Carlisle Wordsworth had died before the election; no by-election was held.

Labor
George Keyatta MLA (Townsville)

Country
James Heading MLA (Marodian)

Liberal
Peter Connolly MLA (Kurilpa)

Queensland Labor
Arthur Jones MLA (Charters Towers)
Bill Power MLA (Baroona)

Candidates
Sitting members at the time of the election are shown in bold text.

See also
 1960 Queensland state election
 Members of the Queensland Legislative Assembly, 1957–1960
 Members of the Queensland Legislative Assembly, 1960–1963
 List of political parties in Australia

References
 

Candidates for Queensland state elections